Francesco Mezzoni (born 24 July 2000) is an Italian football player who plays as a midfielder for  club Ancona-Matelica on loan from Napoli.

Club career

Carpi
He spent his youth years at Carpi and was called up for the senior squad on several occasions during 2016–17 Serie B and 2017–18 Serie B seasons, but did not see any field time.

Napoli
On 31 August 2017, he joined Serie A club Napoli. For the next two seasons, he played for the club's Under-19 squad in Campionato Primavera 1 and UEFA Youth League, without any call-ups to the senior squad.

Loan to Carrarese
On 1 August 2019, he joined Serie C club Carrarese on loan.

He made his professional Serie C debut for Carrarese on 24 August 2019 in a game against Pontedera, playing the whole game. He finished the loan with 13 league appearances, 8 of them as a starter, and 1 goal.

Loan to Pontedera
On 30 January 2020, he moved on loan to Pontedera. He played in 4 games (3 as a starter) before Serie C season was abandoned due to the COVID-19 pandemic in Italy.

Loan to Feralpisalò
On 17 September 2020, he joined Feralpisalò on loan.

Loan to Pro Vercelli
On 8 January 2021, he joined Pro Vercelli on loan.

Loan to Pistoiese
On 31 August 2021, he was loaned to Pistoiese.

Loan to Ancona
On 14 July 2022, Mezzoni moved on loan to Ancona-Matelica.

International career
He first represented his country with the Under-18 squad on 7 February 2018 in a friendly against France.

References

External links
 

2000 births
Living people
Footballers from Rome
Italian footballers
Association football midfielders
Serie C players
A.C. Carpi players
S.S.C. Napoli players
Carrarese Calcio players
U.S. Città di Pontedera players
FeralpiSalò players
F.C. Pro Vercelli 1892 players
U.S. Pistoiese 1921 players
Ancona-Matelica players
Italy youth international footballers